Kamla Bhatt is an Indian blogger and contributor to the IndiaTech feature on Silicon Valley's PodTech.Net. Her radio/podcast show is called Kamla Bhatt Show.

Biography

The Deccan Herald, Bangalore's leading newspaper, said of her: "She has always been fascinated by people from all walks of life — be they IT czars or celebrity chefs or Bollywood stars and directors, or a driver."

References

External links
Show & tell on the internet, Deccan Herald, 28 July 2006

Year of birth missing (living people)
Living people
Indian emigrants to the United States
Indian bloggers
Indian podcasters
Marquette University alumni
Jawaharlal Nehru University alumni
Indian women bloggers
Writers from Chennai
Women writers from Tamil Nadu
Women podcasters